Pooley is a surname. Notable people with the surname include:

Charles Edward Pooley (1845–1912), Canadian lawyer and politician
Christiane Pooley (born 1983), visual artist
David Pooley, American football coach
Dean Pooley (born 1986), English footballer
Don Pooley (born 1951), American golfer
Edmund Poley or Pooley (1544–1613), English Member of Parliament
Elsa Pooley (born 1947), South African botanist
Emma Pooley (born 1982), English cyclist
Ernest Pooley (1876–1966), British arts administrator
Fred Pooley (1916–1998), English architect
Ginger Pooley (born 1977), American rock musician
Guy Pooley (born 1965), English rower
Ian Pooley (born 1973), German musician
Isobel Pooley (born 1992), British high jumper
Jason Pooley (born 1969), English cricketer
Kristopher Pooley (born 1976), American rock musician
Leanne Pooley, New Zealand film producer
Olaf Pooley (1914-2015), English actor
Paul Pooley (born 1960), Canadian ice hockey player
Robert Henry Pooley (1878–1954), Canadian lawyer and politician
Ted Pooley (1842–1907), English cricketer
Thomas Pooley (c. 1788–1846), English property developer
Tony Pooley (1938–2004), South African naturalist and conservationist
William Pooley (died 1629), English landowner and politician

See also
Pooley Hall, country house in Warwickshire, England
Pooley Sword, English sword manufacturing company
Pooley Bridge, village in Cumbria, England
Pooley Island, island in British Columbia, Canada
Henry Pooley & Son Ltd, English weighing machine manufacturer